A Street to Die is a 1985 Australian film directed by Bill Bennett and starring Chris Haywood, Jennifer Cluff, Arianthe Galani. It was nominated for four Australian Film Institute Awards; Haywood won the award for Best Actor in a Lead Role. At the Karlovy Vary International Film Festival, Bennett won a Crystal Globe. The film was based on a true story.

Premise
Colin Turner (Chris Haywood), an Australian Vietnam War veteran, blames his recently-discovered cancer on exposure to Agent Orange, and sues the government for compensation, as well as legal recognition of the defoliant’s fatal health effects.

Cast
Chris Haywood as Colin Turner
Jennifer Cluff as Lorraine Turner
Arianthe Galani as Dr. Walsea
Robin Ramsay as Tom
Peter Hehir as Peter Townley
Peter Kowitz as Craig
Malcolm Keith as Real Estate Boss

Production
The film was based on the story of Colin Simpson, a Vietnam veteran who had died while trying to claim money from the Repatriation Department. He believed his illness was caused by Agent Orange. Bill Bennett read about the story in the Weekend Australian while working as a TV documentary maker and pitched it to Peter Luck to be made for The Australians but Luck declined. Bennett then decided to turn it into a dramatic feature. He raised the money himself.

The script was heavily based on fact - Bennett says it was hardly fictionalised at all. Colin Simpson's widow was heavily involved in the research and writing. Bennett says he did not really consider the movie an anti-war statement:
I really saw it as being about the blindness of authorities to accept culpability. To that extent, I suppose, it is an anti-war film, but it was more to do with anti-bureaucracy and a very, very strong sense of injustice, that ultimately what was at work here was the possibility that, if a precedent was established, then huge amounts of money would have to be paid out.

The film was shot primarily in the suburbs of Western Sydney and in the Whalan street where Simpson and his family had lived. Simpson’s real house (in which the widowed Mrs Simpson was still residing) was used for exterior shots while an adjacent home was used for interior scenes. The family who owned the property were paid to temporarily vacate the premises for the duration of the shoot, which took four weeks.

Release
The film was widely screened at festivals and achieved reasonable success at cinemas. It launched Bennett's career as a director.

References

External links

A Street to Die at Australian Screen Online

1985 films
Australian drama films
Crystal Globe winners
1985 drama films
Films directed by Bill Bennett
1980s English-language films